During the 1998–99 English football season, Hull City A.F.C. competed in the Football League Third Division.

Season summary
In November 1998 after a poor start to the season, Mark Hateley departed the club and Warren Joyce was asked to stand in as caretaker manager.

Hull soon made the appointment permanent with Joyce taking on the dual role of player-manager. At the time of his appointment, the Tigers were rooted to the foot of the Third Division table and looked to be heading out of the Football League – and into bankruptcy. However, under Joyce's stewardship, Hull staged a remarkable turnaround and achieved survival with games to spare; Hull City fans christened this season "the Great Escape".

Final league table

Results
Hull City's score comes first

Legend

Football League Third Division

FA Cup

League Cup

Football League Trophy

Squad

Left club during the season

References

Hull City A.F.C. seasons
Hull City
1990s in Kingston upon Hull